On 8 July 1982, West Germany and France played in the semi-finals of the 1982 FIFA World Cup at the Ramón Sánchez Pizjuán Stadium in Seville, Spain. The match is known in both countries as the Night of Seville. The match was won by West Germany 5–4 on penalties. They advanced to face Italy in the final. Thanks to its back-and-forth drama, four goals in extra time and a dramatic penalty shoot-out, the match is regarded as one of the best football matches of all time. It is considered by French captain Michel Platini to be his "most beautiful game." West Germany's victory was the first time in the history of the World Cup that a shoot-out determined the outcome.

Overview
This match, like a number of other matches at this tournament, was played at nine o'clock in the evening, because July daily high temperatures in the south-western Spanish city of Seville averaged ; the hot weather during the tournament had already taken a toll on the players. The day of the match had been very hot, and the temperature even at 21:00 local time at the start of the match was still in the high thirties, with high humidity.

With West Germany's captain and European Footballer of the Year Karl-Heinz Rummenigge benched from the start due to a hamstring injury, West Germany were nonetheless the first to score, in the 17th minute. With Klaus Fischer charging in to challenge the French goalkeeper Jean-Luc Ettori from about 12 yards out, the ball rebounded to Pierre Littbarski, who scored with a first-time shot from 18 yards.

After 27 minutes, Bernd Förster was penalised for holding Dominique Rocheteau and France were awarded a penalty, which was converted by Platini.

Despite several good chances for both sides, including Manuel Amoros hitting the crossbar in stoppage time, the score remained at 1–1 at full time. The teams then played two 15-minute periods of extra time. In the second minute of the first period, Marius Tresor struck an 11-yard volley after a deflected free kick from just outside the box to put France ahead for the first time in the match, 2–1. Rummenigge entered the game shortly afterwards in place of Hans-Peter Briegel, but it was France who struck once again at the 98 minute mark, with Alain Giresse firing a first-time shot from 18 yards off Harald Schumacher's right post and into the goal to give France a 3–1 advantage.

Four minutes later, West Germany began their comeback, with Rummenigge flicking home an outside-of-the-foot volley from six yards that cut France's lead in half. Three minutes into the second extra time period, Fischer scored with a bicycle kick from six yards, and the teams were level once more at 3–3, where the score remained until the end of extra time.

The penalty shootout began with Giresse converting the first kick for France, which was answered by West Germany's Manfred Kaltz. Amoros for France and Paul Breitner for West Germany both converted, but in the third round, Uli Stielike's shot was blocked by Ettori, following Rocheteau's successful strike, giving France a 3–2 lead. However, in the fourth round, France failed to capitalise: Schumacher blocked Didier Six's shot, and Littbarski scored for West Germany. Platini and Rummenigge both scored in the fifth round, and the shootout, tied at 4–4, moved to sudden-death. In the sixth round, Maxime Bossis's shot was blocked, and Horst Hrubesch converted to give West Germany the win.

Controversy
In the second half, the West German goalkeeper Schumacher collided with the French player Patrick Battiston, which knocked Battiston unconscious and forced him from the game with two missing teeth, three cracked ribs, and damaged vertebrae, though no foul was given. France were forced to use their second substitution to replace Battiston, who himself had come on only ten minutes earlier. By contrast, West Germany were able to use their own second substitution to bring on Rummenigge in extra time, and he scored five minutes after taking the field.

Match summary

References

External links
 Match summary at the FFF website 

1982 FIFA World Cup
FIFA World Cup matches
1982
1982
Fra
France at the 1982 FIFA World Cup
Sports competitions in Seville
FIFA World Cup 1982
July 1982 sports events in Europe
20th century in Seville
Nicknamed sporting events